Venus Williams was the defending champion and successfully defended her title by defeating Kim Clijsters 6–2, 6–4 in the final.

Seeds
The top four seeds receive a bye into the second round.

Draw

Finals

Top half

Bottom half

External links
 ITF tournament edition details
 Tournament draws

2003 Singles
2003 WTA Tour